"Search and Destroy" is a song recorded by American rock band Thirty Seconds to Mars, for their third studio album This Is War. It appears as the ninth track on the album. Written by lead vocalist Jared Leto, the song was released as a promotional single to UK radio on October 25, 2010. The track was produced by Flood and 30 Seconds to Mars, and was originally not going to be on the album because the song was so hard to mix.

Background and recording
The song includes a heavy contribution from the band's fans, captured singing a chorus created from layers of the band's Summit recordings.

While doing an exclusive track by track album preview, Jared told MusicRadar:

Live performances
"Search and Destroy" was a regular on setlists during the Into the Wild and Closer to the Edge tours, after This Is War had released. When played live, guitars and bass are tuned to Eb standard (low to high: Eb-Ab-Db-Gb-Bb-Eb).

Track listing
All songs written by Jared Leto.

Personnel
Credits adapted from This Is War liner notes.

Performed by 30 Seconds to Mars
Written by Jared Leto
Published by Apocraphex Music (ASCAP)/Universal Music - Z Tunes, LLC (ASCAP)
Produced by Flood, Steve Lillywhite, 30 Seconds to Mars
Recorded by Ryan Williams, Matt Radosevich at The International Centre for the Advancement of the Arts and Sciences of Sound, Los Angeles, CA
Additional engineering by Tom Biller, Rob Kirwan, Jamie Schefman, Sonny Diperri
Mixed by Ryan Williams at Pulse Recording Studios, Los Angeles, CA
Additional strings orchestrated and recorded by Michael Einziger at Harvard University, Cambridge, MA
Mastered by Stephen Marcussen at Marcussen Mastering, Hollywood, CA

Charts

Release history

References

Thirty Seconds to Mars songs
2009 singles
Songs written by Jared Leto
Song recordings produced by Flood (producer)
2009 songs
Virgin Records singles
EMI Records singles